Ettumanur railway station (Code: ETMR) is a railway station in Kottayam district, Kerala and falls under the Thiruvananthapuram railway division of the Southern Railway zone, Indian Railways.

Train TimeTable at Ettumanur

Distance to places of interest 

Railway stations in Kottayam district
Railway stations opened in 1904